Michael Uebel (born 1964), a pioneer in the application of psychological insights to the historical intersections of social, personal, and imaginative phenomena, is a psychotherapist and researcher in Austin, Texas.  He has taught literature and critical theory at the University of Virginia, at Georgetown University, where he taught in the Communication, Culture, and Technology Program and the English Department, and at the University of Kentucky, where he held a faculty position in the Department of English, and was affiliated with the Committee on Social Theory and Women’s Studies. As of 2012, Uebel has been appointed Lecturer in the School of Social Work at the University of Texas at Austin.  He is the author and/or editor of three major studies and the author of over 40 journal essays and encyclopedia articles.  Uebel lectures nationally and internationally on issues concerning social history, mental health, and the challenges of humanism.  In 2009, he co-founded the Interdependence Project-Austin, a branch of the New York city-based nonprofit organization (IDP) dedicated to fostering the intersection of the arts, activism, and contemplative traditions.  Uebel serves as Director of Contemplative Studies.

Education 
From the University of Wisconsin–Madison, Uebel received his B.A., with Distinction, in the fields of comparative literature and English literature. He completed both his M.A. and PhD in literature at the University of Virginia, continuing his post-doctoral studies by earning the Master of Science in Social Work Degree from the University of Texas at Austin.  He also studied psychotherapy at both the Houston-Galveston Psychoanalytic Institute and is currently an instructor and student at the Austin Center for Relational Psychoanalysis and Psychotherapy.

Research 
Uebel’s research is best described as humanistic. Examining issues such as the formation of utopian thought, the ideology of gender relations, and the potentials of human existence, Uebel has urged a reconnaissance of disciplines as seemingly disparate as psychoanalysis, gerontology, philosophy, and social science. Uebel is forging an approach to literary, philosophical, and social phenomena that eludes the narcissistic allegorization of history that mires much contemporary cultural studies work.  Increasingly, Uebel's writing focuses on the currents of cultural analysis in the humanities.

Major works 
Uebel’s major works to date include a study of the legend of Prester John and utopian thought formation in the early Middle Ages (Ecstatic Transformation:  On the Uses of Alterity in the Middle Ages, 2005), a volume of essays on the cultural intersections of race and masculinity (with Harry Stecopoulos, Race and the Subject of Masculinities, 1997), and a volume of essays on the significance of labor in the High Middle Ages (with Kellie Robertson, The Middle Ages at Work, 2004).  He has also edited a volume of essays on medieval culture for New Literary History (1996).

Selected recent articles and chapters 
"Empty Curriculum, Empty Mind: Teaching Mindfulness with Military Veterans," Journal of Humanistic Psychology, (2019): 1-20. doi: 10.1177/0022167819834737.
"Positive and Negative Valences of the Human Body in Schizophrenia: A Pilot Study of Emotional Narrative Regarding the Front and Back," with Alfonso Santarpia, Giuseppe Alessandro Veltri, Herve Berreby, & Armando Amos Menicacci, New Ideas in Psychology, 54 (2019): 27-34. doi: 10.1016/j.newideapsych.2019.01.002. 
"Corpus Delicti: Frances Glessner Lee and the Art of Suspicion," Epidemiology and Psychiatric Sciences, (2017): 1-3. doi: 10.1017/S2045796017000543.
"Dirty Rotten Shame? The Value and Ethical Functions of Shame," Journal of Humanistic Psychology, (2016): 1-20. doi: 10.1177/0022167816631398.
"Pain Control," in Encyclopedia of Pharmacology and Society. Ed. Sarah E. Boslaugh. Thousand Oaks, CA: Sage 2016.
"Taoism (Daoism)," in Encyclopedia of Alcohol: Social, Cultural, and Historical Perspectives. Ed. Scott C. Martin. Thousand Oaks, CA: Sage, 2015. 
"Mindfulness and Engaged Buddhism: Implications for a Generalist Macro Social Work Practice," with Clayton Shorkey, in  Mindfulness and Acceptance in Social Work: Evidence-Based Interventions and Emerging Applications, Ed. Matthew S. Boone. Oakland, CA: New Harbinger Publications, 2014. 215-234.
"History and Development of Instructional Technology and Media in Social Work Education," with Clayton Shorkey, The Journal of Social Work Education, 50.2 (2014): 247-261.
"Psychoanalysis and the Question of Violence: From Masochism to Shame," American Imago, 69.4 (2012): 473-505.
"Defense Analysis," "Lay Analysis," Psychoanalytic Terms and Concepts. Ed. Elizabeth Auchincloss and Eslee Samberg. New York/New Haven:  American Psychoanalytic Association and Yale University Press, 2012.
"Ecocentrism," in Green Ethics and Philosophy, vol. 8 of the Green Society series.  Eds. Julie Newman & J. Geoffrey Golson. Thousand Oaks, CA, 2011.
"Grassroots Moral Panics," in Encyclopedia of Drug Policy. Eds. Mark Kleiman, James Hawdon, J. Geoffrey Golson.  Thousand Oaks, CA: Sage, 2011. 
"We Have Never Been Schreber:  Paranoia, Medieval and Modern," with Erin Labbie, in The Legitimacy of the Middle Ages: On the Unwritten History of Theory.  Ed. Andrew Cole & D. Vance Smith.  Durham, NC:  Duke University Press, 2010. 127-58.
"Assessing Spiritual Dimensions of Chemical Dependence Treatment and Recovery: Research and Practice," with Shorkey, C., & Windsor, L., International Journal of Mental Health and Addiction, 6.3 (2008): 286-305.
"Classical Psychoanalytic Thought, Contemporary Developments, and Clinical Social Work," with Roberta R. Greene, in Human Behavior Theory and Social Work Practice, ed. Roberta R Greene, 3rd Ed.  New York:  Haworth Press, 2008.
"Minnesota Model," "Rational Recovery," "Secular Organization for Sobriety," with Clayton Shorkey, Encyclopedia of Substance Abuse Prevention, Treatment, and Recovery.  Ed. Gary L. Fisher.  Thousand Oaks, CA: Sage, 2008.
"Gestalt Therapy," with Clayton Shorkey, Encyclopedia of Social Work, 20th Edition. Ed. Terry Mizrahi and Larry Davis.  New York:  Oxford University Press, 2008.
"Gerontological Social Workers," with Roberta R. Greene, The Encyclopedia of Elder Care: The Comprehensive Resource on Geriatric and Social Care.  2nd Edition. Ed. Elizabeth Capezuti, Eugenia L. Siegler, & Mathy D. Mezey.  New York:  Springer, 2007.
"Racism" and "Social Construction (Theoretical Perspectives)," Routledge International Encyclopedia of Men and Masculinities.  Ed. Michael Flood, Judith Kegan Gardiner, Bob Pease, and Keith Pringle.  New York:  Routledge, 	2007.
"Sadomasochism," The Historical Encyclopedia of Prostitution and Sex Work.  Ed. Melissa Hope Ditmore.  New York:  Greenwood Press, 2006.  
"Intervention Continued: Providing Care through Case Management," with Roberta R. Greene, Journal of Human Behavior in the Social Environment 14.1/2 (2007): 31-50.  Also published in Contemporary Issues of Care, ed. Roberta R. Greene.  New York:  Routledge, 2007.
"B(eing)-Students," Journal of Narrative Theory 37.2 (2007): 326-48.
"Opening Time:  Psychoanalysis and Medieval Culture," Cultural Studies of the Modern Middle Ages.  Ed. Eileen Joy, Myra Seaman, Mary K. Ramsey, & Kimberly Bell.  New York: Palgrave/Macmillan, 2007.  269-94.
"Acoustical Alterity," Exemplaria 16.2 (2004):  349-65.
"Striptopia?" Social Semiotics 14.2 (2004):  3-19.
"Conceptualizing Labor in the Middle Ages," The Middle Ages at Work:  Practicing Labor in Late Medieval England.  Ed. Kellie Robertson & Michael Uebel.  New York: Palgrave/Macmillan, 2004.  1-15.

Notes

1964 births
Living people
20th-century American philosophers
21st-century American philosophers
University of Virginia alumni
Philosophers from Texas
American psychotherapists
Philosophers of sexuality
Feminist studies scholars
Literature educators
American medievalists
American non-fiction writers
Writers from Wisconsin
Gender studies academics
Male feminists
Writers from Austin, Texas
Philosophers from Wisconsin
Historians from Texas